A list of films produced in the Cinema of Portugal ordered by year of release in the 1970s. For an alphabetical list of Portuguese films see :Category:Portuguese films

1970s

External links
 Portuguese film at the Internet Movie Database

1970s
Films
Portuguese

pt:Lista de filmes portugueses